Oparczyska  is a village in the administrative district of Gmina Bobrowniki, within Lipno County, Kuyavian-Pomeranian Voivodeship, in north-central Poland.

The village has a population of 80.

References

Oparczyska